Imrie may refer to the following people:

Amy Elizabeth Imrie (1870–1944), British heiress and Roman Catholic nun
Angus Imrie (born 1994), English actor
Celia Imrie (born 1952), English actress
Dougie Imrie (born 1983), Scottish footballer
James Imrie (born 1909), Scottish footballer
Kathryn Imrie (born 1967), Scottish golfer
Kirsten Imrie (born 1967), English model
Marilyn Imrie (born 1947), Scottish radio director and producer
Megan Imrie (born 1986), Canadian biathlete
Thomas Imrie (born 1937), British ice hockey player
William Imrie (1836–1906), a Liverpool shipowner
Willie Imrie (1908 – c. 1944), Scottish footballer

See also
Greetings from Imrie House, 2005 debut album of The Click Five